Philips House may refer to:

McConnell-Woodson-Philips House, Nicholasville, Kentucky, listed on the National Register of Historic Places (NRHP) in Jessamine County
Bellamy-Philips House, also known as Oak Forest Plantation, near Battleboro, Nash County, North Carolina
Hardman Philips House, also known as Moshannon Hall and Halehurst, a historic home located at Philipsburg, Centre County, Pennsylvania

See also
Philips-Thompson Buildings, Wilmington, Delaware, NRHP-listed
Phillips House (disambiguation)